Catarina is a census-designated place (CDP) in Dimmit County, Texas, United States. The population was 118 at the 2010 census. The community has no  U.S. Post Office.

Geography
Catarina is located at  (28.347567, -99.614690).

Demographics
As of the census of 2000, there were 135 people, 46 households, and 40 families residing in the CDP. The population density was 35.7 people per square mile (13.8/km2). There were 77 housing units at an average density of 20.4/sq mi (7.9/km2). The racial makeup of the CDP was 80.74% White, 19.26% from other races. Hispanic or Latino of any race were 79.26% of the population.

There were 46 households, out of which 30.4% had children under the age of 18 living with them, 71.7% were married couples living together, 17.4% had a female householder with no husband present, and 10.9% were non-families. 8.7% of all households were made up of individuals, and 2.2% had someone living alone who was 65 years of age or older. The average household size was 2.93 and the average family size was 3.15.

In the CDP, the population was spread out, with 20.7% under the age of 18, 8.9% from 18 to 24, 19.3% from 25 to 44, 27.4% from 45 to 64, and 23.7% who were 65 years of age or older. The median age was 46 years. For every 100 females, there were 87.5 males. For every 100 females age 18 and over, there were 91.1 males.

The median income for a household in the CDP was $41,000, and the median income for a family was $41,000. Males had a median income of $58,750 versus $24,750 for females. The per capita income for the CDP was $16,270. There were 5.0% of families and 5.9% of the population living below the poverty line, including no under eighteens and 8.7% of those over 64.

Education
The CDP is served by the Carrizo Springs Consolidated Independent School District.

In popular culture
Catarina is the subject of the Texas Country song "Cowboy From Catarina" by Max Stalling.

References

External links
 Catarina, Texas Handbook of Texas Online article

Census-designated places in Dimmit County, Texas
Census-designated places in Texas